Sir Dunbar Plunket Barton, 1st Baronet PC (29 October 1853 – 11 September 1937) was an Anglo-Irish British politician, author and judge.

Barton was born in Merrion Square, Dublin, the eldest son of the magistrate Thomas Henry Barton, a younger son of Dunbar Barton of Rochestown, County Tipperary, who was High Sheriff of Tipperary in 1810. His mother was Hon. Charlotte Plunket, daughter of John Plunket, 3rd Baron Plunket and Charlotte Bushe. Barton was descended from Lord Chief Justice Charles Kendal Bushe; and from the co-founder of the celebrated wine merchants Barton and Guestier.

He attended Harrow and Corpus Christi College, Oxford. Nephew of the Anglican Archbishop of Dublin, Barton was a sincere Protestant, but exceptionally tolerant in all matters of religion: Maurice Healy recalled him quoting a saying of his father that whether one is a Protestant or a Catholic is largely a chance of birth. When Barton was a boy, his father instructed him to guess the distance between his mother's bedroom window and the window at the home next door, to which he guessed 20 ft. "Well, my boy," his father told him, "You are a Protestant; but always remember that if you had been born 20 ft. to the east you would have been a Catholic."

Barton was called to the Irish Bar in 1880, to the English Bar in 1893, from Gray's Inn (of which he was elected Treasurer in 1922), and took silk in 1898. He served as an Irish Unionist Member of Parliament (MP) for Mid Armagh from 1891 to 1900 and was Solicitor-General for Ireland for two years (1898–1900). In January 1900 he was appointed a judge of the Queen's Bench Division of the High Court of Justice in Ireland, to which appointment he was sworn in on 2 February 1900.

In 1904 he was transferred to the Chancery Division where he served until his retirement in 1918. He was created a baronet of Fethard in the County of Tipperary on 28 January 1918: since his only son predeceased him the title became extinct at his death.
 
He married Mary Tottenham Manley in 1900; their only son, Dunbar, died unmarried in 1929. He died at Gray's Inn Square in London in 1937, aged 83. He was a keen historian, with a particular interest in Marshal Bernadotte, and is said to have done much to popularise golf in Ireland. He was president of the Golfing Union of Ireland and of the Royal Dublin Golf Club, Royal Portrush Golf Club, and Greenore Golf Club.

Works
 Timothy Healy: Memories and Anecdotes
 Bernadotte, The First Phase, 1763–1799
 Bernadotte and Napoleon, 1800–1810
 Bernadotte, Prince and King, 1810–1844
 The Amazing Career of Bernadotte, 1763 to 1844
 Links Between Ireland and Shakespeare
 Links Between Shakespeare and the Law
 The Story of the Inns of Court

References

Maurice Healy The Old Munster Circuit Michael Joseph Ltd 1939
Ball. F. Elrington The Judges in Ireland 1221–1921 John Murray London 1926

External links

1853 births
1937 deaths
Alumni of Corpus Christi College, Oxford
Baronets in the Baronetage of the United Kingdom
Irish Unionist Party MPs
Members of the Parliament of the United Kingdom for County Armagh constituencies (1801–1922)
Solicitors-General for Ireland
UK MPs 1886–1892
UK MPs 1892–1895
UK MPs 1895–1900
People from County Armagh
Irish non-fiction writers
Politicians from Dublin (city)
Members of the Privy Council of Ireland
Judges of the High Court of Justice in Ireland
Members of Gray's Inn
Presidents of the Oxford Union
Lawyers from Dublin (city)
People educated at Harrow School